Receivables may refer to:

 Notes receivable, claims for which formal instruments of credit are issued as evidence of debt
 Receivables turnover ratio, a financial ratio

See also
 Receivable